Ladwal is a village in Sultanpur Lodhi tehsil in Kapurthala district of Punjab, India. The village is administrated by a Sarpanch who is an elected representative of village as per the constitution of India and Panchayati raj (India).

Demography 
According to the report published by Census India in 2011, Ladwal has a total number of 78 houses and population of 372 of which include 203 males and 169 females. Literacy rate of Ladwal is 75.22%, lower than state average of 75.84%.  The population of children under the age of 6 years is 37 which is 9.95% of total population of Ladwal and child sex ratio is approximately 682, lower than state average of 846.

Population data

Caste  
The village has schedule caste (SC) constitutes 33.33% of total population of the village and it doesn't have any Schedule Tribe (ST) population.

Work profile
As per census 2011, 127 people were engaged in work activities out of the total population of Dhak Khalwara which includes 124 males and 3 females. According to census survey report 2011, 97.64% workers (Employment or Earning more than 6 Months) describe their work as main work and 2.36% workers are involved in Marginal activity providing livelihood for less than 6 months.

Air travel connectivity 
The closest airport to the village is Sri Guru Ram Dass Jee International Airport.

Villages in Kapurthala

References

List of cities near the village 
Bhulath
Kapurthala 
Phagwara 
Sultanpur Lodhi

Air travel connectivity 
The closest International airport to the village is Sri Guru Ram Dass Jee International Airport.

External links
 Villages in Kapurthala
 List of Villages in Kapurthala Tehsil

Villages in Kapurthala district